Takia is an Austronesian language spoken on Karkar Island, Bagabag Island, and coastal villages Megiar and Serang, Madang Province, Papua New Guinea. It has been syntactically restructured by Waskia, a Papuan language spoken on the island.

Children are discouraged from using Takia, and it is being supplanted by Tok Pisin and English.

Phonology 

 is heard as  before a consonant preceding .

References

External links
 Takia Vocabulary List (from the World Loanword Database)
 Kaipuleohone has archived a Takia word list as part of Robert Blust's field notes

Bel languages
Languages of Madang Province
Endangered Papuan languages